Shelopugino is the name of several rural localities in Russia:

Shelopugino, Pskov Oblast, a village in Gdovsky District of Pskov Oblast
Shelopugino, Zabaykalsky Krai, a selo in Shelopuginsky District of Zabaykalsky Krai